Edalakudy  is an area about 3 km from the Nagercoil town in Kanyakumari district. It is located along the Kanyakumari highway (NH 47) and about 17 km from the beach of Kanyakumari, 5 km from Chothavilai Beach and 10 km from Chankuthurai Beach. The famous Shiva temple in Suchindram is 3 km away from Edalakudy. Edalakudy forms the formal end of the Nagercoil Municipality. The main streets of this region are Pattariar Nedum Theru (Pattariar Long Street), Puthu Theru (New Street), Kovil Theru and Nedum Theru, these streets contains the earliest settlers of the city of Nagercoil.Edalakudy forms the formal end of the Nagercoil Municipal Corporation. The Famous Orator the Tamil poet and Scholar Sathavathani Sheikh Thambi Pavalar was born here.There are Many Masjids in this locality.The Most popular is ‘Bawa Kassim Valiyullah Mosque’ and the most popular  “Bawakasim Oliyullah Community Hall” is also located here. 

The area falls under Agastheeswaram Taluk in the district of Kanyakumari. 

Hospitals near by 

1.Abdul Kadher Hospital 

2.Ugasewa Charitable Trust Hospital 

3.Sriram Orthopaedic Hospital 

4.Naidu Hosiptal

Schools nearby 

There are only a few schools in this area; though most of the children study in well known schools in Nagercoil town.
The secondary school, Sathavathani Sheikh Thambi Pavalar Government Higher Secondary School, situated near NH 47, is built on the site of the former Edalakudy Jail where independence activists were detained, tortured, and executed under colonial rule.

References 

Cities and towns in Kanyakumari district